Yvonne Leuthold (born 30 January 1980) is a British former handball player. She played for the British national team, and competed at the 2012 Summer Olympics in London. She was born in Bern but qualified to represent Great Britain through her Welsh father.

A right back, Leuthold began her career with the University of Bern's handball team. From 2003 to 2009, she played with DHB Rotweiss Thun. Following her spell with the club, she left to play in Germany with SG BBM Bietigheim and SV Allensbach. Following the Olympics, she returned to DHB Rotweiss Thun, playing there until her retirement in 2017.

In 2019, she was elected to the board of the SPAR Premium League.

References

External links

British female handball players
1980 births
Living people
Handball players at the 2012 Summer Olympics
Olympic handball players of Great Britain
Sportspeople from Bern